The Bull Fork Formation is a geologic formation in north central Kentucky and southwestern Ohio. It preserves fossils dating back to the Ordovician period.

John H. Peck assigned strata previously called the Arnheim, Waynesville, Liberty, and Whitewater Formations in Kentucky to the Bull Fork Formation.

See also

 List of fossiliferous stratigraphic units in Ohio

References

 

Ordovician Kentucky
Ordovician Indiana
Ordovician Ohio
Ordovician southern paleotemperate deposits